Richard Burckardt (23 July 1901 – 14 November 1981) was a German politician of the Free Democratic Party (FDP) and former member of the German Bundestag.

Life 
In the 1961 federal elections he entered the Bundestag via the North Rhine-Westphalia state list, of which he was a member until 1965. From 1963 to 1965 he was deputy chairman of the Bundestag Committee on Foreign Trade.

Literature

References

1901 births
1981 deaths
Members of the Bundestag for North Rhine-Westphalia
Members of the Bundestag 1961–1965
Members of the Bundestag for the Free Democratic Party (Germany)